Park Hall is a derelict laird's house situated west of the village of Bixter, in the parish of Sandsting on the Mainland of Shetland, Scotland. It has fallen into disrepair due to its abandonment.

History 
It was constructed around 1900 by a local doctor.

Description 
The building is made of concrete and holds two floors. In the garden there is a Moorish temple which was previously used as a septic system. Originally two gate-piers were present at the south entrance but now only one is standing.

Disrepair 
The neglect of the house has had an effect not only on the gate-piers. Visits to the house since 1997 have shown the house is crumbling. More particularly, the walls are severely fractured in certain areas, the roof has mostly been displaced and much pipework and guttering has also been lost.

Ownership 
Park Hall has been a listed building since 26 March 1997 and it is currently in the possession of Historic Scotland.

References 

Country houses in Shetland
Listed houses in Scotland
Historic Scotland properties in Shetland
Category C listed buildings in Shetland
1900 architecture
Mainland, Shetland